Sleeve gun is a generic term for small firearm designed to be concealed under a long-sleeved coat or jacket—in fictional examples there is often a mechanism to extend it out into the hand to fire.

Real examples

The "sleeve gun" was developed during World War II by Station IX of the Special Operations Executive. The design was by Hugh Reeves. It was essentially a version of the noise-suppressed Welrod pistol, minus the pistol grip, and produced in both .32 ACP and 9×19mm. Between 150 and 200 of the guns were manufactured almost certainly by Birmingham Small Arms Company. A Mark 1 version was designed but its unclear if it ever made it off the drawing board.

In film and television
Though designs vary, most fictional sleeve guns involve a small conventional pistol on a sliding or telescoping rail, which quickly releases the weapon into the hand for firing, either by a trigger mechanism, or just the sudden movement of the forearm. Such sleeve guns have appeared in film and television.

Film

 Mr. Wong in Chinatown (1939)
 Taxi Driver (1976)
 Blood Debts (1985)
 Red Heat (1988)
 The Adventures of Ford Fairlane (1990)
 Maverick (1994)
 Desperado (1995)
 Alien Resurrection (1997)
 Sukiyaki Western Django (2007)
 Hot Fuzz (2007)
 Sherlock Holmes (2009)
 Django Unchained (2012)

Television

 The Wild Wild West (1965–1969)
 Hogan's Heros (1965-1971)
 Jumanji (TV series) (1996)
 Archer (2009)
 Hetty in NCIS: Los Angeles carries one (2009 to present)
 Justified (2010)
 The Walking Dead (TV series) (2011)
 Fargo (2014)
 Timeless (TV series) (2016)
 Vice Principals (2017)
 Gotham (TV series) (2017)
 Warrior (TV series) (2019)
 Walker (TV series) (2021)

See also
Spring-gun

References

External links
 

Silenced firearms
Firearm components
Handgun holsters
Armwear